According to Shiva Purana, Batuk Bhairav or 'Vatuk Bhairav' is a group of gods who are worshipped before the commencement of the worship of Shiva.
The gods were originally the sons of a great Brahmin devotee of Shiva. The Brahmin with his sincere worship had highly satisfied Shiva and He granted godly status to the sons of the Brahmin. Shiva then granted a boon that anyone who wanted to worship Him would have to first worship the sons of the Brahmin. These sons of the Brahmin came to be known as ‘’’Batuk Bhairav’’’.
Literally the first word ‘Batuk’ means ‘he who is the son of a Brahmin’.

References

Hindu gods